The Silver City Limited was a passenger train operated by Australian National between Adelaide and Broken Hill.

History
The Silver City Limited commenced operating on 14 December 1986 Adelaide and Broken Hill. It ceased operating on 31 December 1990 when all regional passenger services were withdrawn in South Australia.

Rolling stock
The train was formed of CB class railcars. It was operated on occasions by Bluebird railcars.

External Reading 

 Passenger trains west of Broken Hill before 1986
 The Silver City Comet power cars
 Why was the Silver city comet important?

References

Named passenger trains of Australia
Rail transport in South Australia
Railway services introduced in 1986
Railway services discontinued in 1990
1986 establishments in Australia
1990 disestablishments in Australia
Discontinued railway services in Australia